Lamprima is a genus of beetles in the family Lucanidae that contains five species. They are found in Australasia.

Species

See also 
 Phalacrognathus muelleri

References

External links 
 
 
 Genus: Allotopus. Lamprima, Phalacrognathus, Rhyssonotus

Lampriminae
Lucanidae genera